William Thomas Wiley (October 21, 1937April 25, 2021) was an American artist. His work spanned a broad range of media including drawing, painting, sculpture, film, performance, and pinball. At least some of Wiley's work has been referred to as funk art.

Early life and education
William Thomas Wiley was born on October 21, 1937, in Bedford, Indiana. He was raised in Indiana, Texas, and in Richland, Washington. 

Wiley moved to San Francisco in the 1950s to study at the California School of Fine Arts (now known as the San Francisco Art Institute); where he earned his BFA degree in 1960 and his MFA degree two years later. Wiley was classmates with Robert Hudson.

Career 
In 1963, Wiley joined the faculty of the University of California, Davis (U.C. Davis) art department with Bay Area Funk Movement artists Robert Arneson and Roy DeForest. During that time Wiley instructed students including Bruce Nauman, Deborah Butterfield, Stephen Laub, and Christopher Brown. According to Dan Graham, the literary, punning element of Nauman's work came from Wiley. Wiley also acknowledged the effect Nauman had on his own work.

His first solo exhibition was held at the San Francisco Museum of Modern Art in 1960. In the late 1960s Wiley collaborated with the minimalist composer Steve Reich and introduced him to Bruce Nauman.

Wiley continued to build upon his growing stature as a major artist with works appearing in the Venice Biennial (1980) and Whitney Biennial (1983).  He also had major exhibitions at the San Francisco Museum of Modern Art (1981), M. H. de Young Memorial Museum, San Francisco (1996), and the Corcoran Gallery of Art, Washington, D.C. (2005).

In 2009, the Smithsonian American Art Museum presented a retrospective of Wiley's career titled What's It All Mean:  William T. Wiley in Retrospect, from October 2, 2009 through January 24, 2010. A review in the Wall Street Journal stated: "Mr. Wiley's work is unlike any other in recent art... He is less a contemporary artist than a national treasure."

In 2010, the retrospective moved to the Berkeley Art Museum, from March 17 to July 18.  The catalogue for the retrospective, "What's It All Mean: William T. Wiley in Retrospect", was co-published by the Smithsonian American Art Museum and University of California Press. In 2017, Wiley was the subject of a solo exhibition at the Bivins Gallery in Dallas, Texas, William T. Wiley: Where the Rub Her Meats the Rode.

In 2019, Hosfelt Gallery presented William T. Wiley: Sculpture, Eyes Wear Tug Odd, which emphasized Wiley's sculptures and constructions and their relationship to his work in other mediums.  In a review for Square Cylinder, David M. Roth wrote, "In all, there are 40 pieces in the show, all of them worthy of sustained contemplation and discussion.  I visited the exhibition twice, and each time I left the gallery feeling as if my head were about to explode, so dense is the imagery and text contained in these works.  It borders on horror vacui.  Given the madness engulfing us, that approach seems right.  Wiley’s art, always extraordinarily prescient, now feels more relevant than ever."

Also a singer and musician, Wiley collaborated with German composer Efdemin aka Phillip Sollmann, performing vocals on "Oh, Lovely Appearance of Death" for the 2019 album New Atlantic on the Ostgut Ton label. Fact described the project as "inspired by Francis Bacon's 17th century utopian novel of the same name and according to the label 'oscillates between fast, kaleidoscopic techno, multilayered drones and acoustic instrumentation', incorporating the sounds of Sollmann's dance floor-oriented productions as Efdemin and his more experimental work."

Wiley died on April 25, 2021 in a hospital in Greenbrae, California, due to complications of Parkinson’s disease.

Collections
Wiley is known for paintings that incorporate sketch-like drawings and handwritten notations.  Fan for the A.M., in the collection of the Honolulu Museum of Art, demonstrates the artist's technique.  It consists of areas of bright acrylic paint surrounded by drawings and writing in colored pencil.  Other public collections holding Wiley's work include the Di Rosa Center for Contemporary Art (Napa, California), and the Honolulu Museum of Art.

The Art Institute of Chicago, the Baltimore Museum of Art, the Dallas Museum of Art, the Denver Art Museum, the Los Angeles County Museum of Art, the Minneapolis Institute of Arts, the Museum of Fine Arts, Boston, the Museum of Modern Art (New York), the New Britain Museum of American Art (New Britain, Connecticut), the Nelson-Atkins Museum (Kansas City, Missouri), the Philadelphia Museum of Art, the San Francisco Museum of Modern Art, the Smithsonian American Art Museum (Washington, D.C.), the Van Abbemuseum (Eindhoven, Netherlands) the Walker Art Center (Minneapolis), and the Whitney Museum of American Art.

Wiley was a recipient of a Guggenheim Fellowship Award in 2004.

References

Further reading
 Joann Moser with John Yau and John G. Hanhardt; WHAT'S IT ALL MEAN, WILLIAM T. WILEY, IN RETROSPECT; Smithsonian American Art Museum, University of California Press, Berkeley 2009;

External links
 Official website
 
 
  April 2019 Artforum article on William T. Wiley
  Square Cylinder review of Hosfelt Gallery show in 2019
 On KQED's Spark program
 YOU SEE Panel discussion with Manuel Neri and Wayne Thiebaud
 Video interview and artist's films at www.artbabble.org
 In Case You Missed the Revolution, Man New York Times review of Wiley's 2009-2010 Smithsonian American Art Museum show.
 He's Wily, And Witty Wall Street Journal of Wiley's 2009-2010 Smithsonian American Art Museum show.

1937 births
2021 deaths
American conceptual artists
American contemporary artists
American printmakers
Artists from Indiana
Postmodern artists
People from Bedford, Indiana
San Francisco Art Institute alumni
Artists from the San Francisco Bay Area